Kir Bulychev ( [Kir Bulychyov]; 18 October 1934 – 5 September 2003) is a pen name of Igor Vsevolodovich Mozheiko (И́горь Все́володович Може́йко), a Soviet Russian science fiction writer, critic, translator and historian. His magnum opus is a children's science fiction series Alisa Selezneva, although most of his books are adult-oriented. His books were adapted for film, TV and animation over 20 times – more than any other Russian science fiction author – and Bulychev himself wrote scripts for early adaptations.

Biography
Mozheiko (Mojeiko) received a Master's degree in 1965 and a Ph.D. in 1981. From 1963 he worked in the Institute of Oriental Studies of the USSR Academy of Sciences. He was a specialist in the medieval history of Burma, and wrote a biography of Aung San.

He first used the pseudonym Kir Bulychev in 1965, for his very first science fiction story, "A Girl Nothing Can Happen To". It was the first in what would become his most popular book series, Alisa Selezneva, that eventually comprised more than 50 novellas and short stories. This children's science fiction series is centered around the titular heroine, a teenage girl from the future, who travels through space and time, solves mysteries, makes discoveries and saves endangered peoples and species. Bulychov kept writing Alisa for the rest of his life: the last book appeared in 2003, months before his death. There were four animated and three life-action adaptations of Alisa stories, as well as tie-in comics and video games.

Another of Bulychev's best-known works is a series of short stories about Veliky Guslar, a Russian town that attracts all kinds of aliens and supernatural beings. This fictional city is based on the real city of Veliky Ustyug. He also wrote many standalone science fiction novels, including The Last War (1970), Thirteen Years of Travel, Those Who Survive (adapted as the animated film Pereval), The Witches Cave (filmed), River Chronos and Abduction of the Wizard.

Bulychev wrote scripts for more than 20 movies: according to Mir Fantastiki magazine, he is the most adapted Russian science fiction author. Besides his own writing, he translated numerous American science fiction stories into Russian.

Selected bibliography

Only novels and novellas included.
Alisa Selezneva series
 Ржавый фельдмаршал (The Rusty Field Marshal, 1968)
 Путешествие Алисы (Alisa's Voyage, 1974)
 День рождения Алисы (Alisa's Birthday, 1974)
 Миллион приключений (A Million Adventures, 1976)
 Сто лет тому вперёд (One Hundred Years Ahead, 1978)
 Пленники астероида (Prisoners of an Asteroid, 1981)
 Лиловый шар (The Lilac Ball, 1983)
 Заповедник сказок (The Reserve of Fairy Tales, 1985)
 Козлик Иван Иванович (Ivan Ivanovich the Goat, 1985)
 Гай-до (Guy-do, 1986)
 Конец Атлантиды (The End of Atlantis, 1987)
 Город без памяти (The City Without Memory, 1988)
 Подземная лодка (The Underground Boat, 1989)
 Война с лилипутами (The War Against the Lilliputians, 1992)
 Алиса и крестоносцы (Alisa and the Crusaders, 1993)
 Излучатель доброты (The Kindness Ray, 1994)
 Дети динозавров (Dinosaur Children, 1995)
 Сыщик Алиса (Alisa the Detective, 1996)
 Привидений не бывает (Ghosts Don't Exist, 1996)
 Опасные сказки (Dangerous Tales, 1997)
 Планета для тиранов (A Planet for Tyrants, 1997)
 Секрет чёрного камня (The Secret of the Black Stone, 1999)
 Алиса и чудовище (Alisa and the Monster, 1999)
 Звёздный пёс (The Star Dog, 2001)
 Вампир Полумракс (Twilights the Vampire, 2001)
 Алиса и Алисия (Alisa and Alicia, 2003)

Veliky Guslar series 
 Марсианское зелье (The Martian Potion, 1971) 
 Нужна свободная планета (A Free Planet Needed, 1977)
 Глубокоуважаемый микроб (Dear Mr Microbe, 1987)
 Перпендикулярный мир (Perpendicular World, 1989) 
 Over 130 short stories, published in seven volumes:
Чудеса в Гусляре (Miracles in Guslar)
Пришельцы в Гусляре (Aliens in Guslar)
Возвращение в Гусляр (Return to Guslar)
Гусляр-2000 (Guslar-2000)
Господа гуслярцы (Gentlemen Guslarians)
Гусляр навеки (Guslar Forever)
Письма в редакцию (Letters to the Editorial Office)

Dr. Pavlish series
 Последняя война (The Last War, 1970)
 Великий дух и беглецы (The Great Spirit and the Refugees, 1972)
 Половина жизни (Half a Life, 1973)
 Закон для дракона (A Law for a Dragon, 1975) 
 Белое платье Золушки (Cinderella's White Dress, 1980) 
 Тринадцать лет пути (Thirteen Years in Flight, 1984) 
 Посёлок (The Settlement, 1988) 
 Пленники долга (Prisoners of Duty, 2009)

Cora Orvath ("InterGPol") series
 Покушение на Тесея (The Attempted Murder of Theseus, 1994) 
 В куриной шкуре (In a Hen's Skin, 1994) 
 Предсказатель прошлого (Prophet of the Past, 1994) 
 Последние драконы (The Last Dragons, 1994) 
 Детский остров (The Children's Island, 1995) 
 На полпути с обрыва (Halfway Down the Ridge, 1995) 
 Зеркало зла (The Mirror of Evil, 1996)

River Chronos series
 Река Хронос (River Chronos, 1992)
 Заповедник для академиков (The Academicians' Reserve, 1992) 
 Усни, красавица (Sleep, Beauty, 1994)
 Купидон (Cupid, 1998) 
 Таких не убивают (Those are not to be Killed, 1998) 
 Младенец Фрей (Baby Frei, 2000)
 Дом в Лондоне (A House in London, 2003)

Andrey Bruce duology
 Агент КФ (SF Agent, 1984)
 Подземелье ведьм (The Witches' Dungeon, 1987)

Non-serialized
 Умение кидать мяч (A Talent for Throwing Balls, 1973)
Похищение чародея (Abduction of the Wizard, 1979)
 На днях землетрясение в Лигоне (The Upcoming Earthquake in Ligon, 1980)
 Два билета в Индию (Two Tickets to India, 1981)
 Тайна Урулгана (The Secret of Urulgan, 1991)
 Любимец (A Pet, 1993)
 Театр теней (Theatre of Shadows, 1998)

Books published in English 
The dates given are the dates of English editions.

Science fiction:
Alice: The Girl from Earth (translation of Alisa's Voyage, July 2002), 
Half a Life (1977)
Gusliar Wonders (1983)
Earth and Elsewhere (1985)
Abduction of the Wizard (1989)
Those Who Survive (translation of The Village, 2000)
History:
1185 A.D. (1989)
South-East Asia: Unity in Diversity. Ahmedabad: Allied (with Gennadi Chufrin) (1989).

Film adaptations 
All scripts are written by Bulychov himself, except noted.

Based on Alisa Selezneva
Mystery of the Third Planet (1981), animated, based on Alisa's Voyage
The Guest from the Future (1985), TV miniseries based on One Hundred Years Ahead
The Lilac Ball (1987), based on the book of the same name
 Prisoners of Yamagiri-Maru (1988), animated, based on a story of the same name
 Island of Rusty General (1988), based on The Rusty Field Marshal
Not written by Bulychev:
Alice's Birthday (2009), animated, based on the novella of the same name
 Alisa Knows What to Do! (2013), animated TV series, based on characters only

Other
 The Throw, or Everything Started on Saturday (1976), TV film, based on the story The Ability to Throw Ball
 Abduction of the Wizard (1981), TV film, based on a story of the same name
 Per Aspera Ad Astra (1981), based on an original script by Bulychev
 Tears Were Falling (1982)
 Comet (1983)
 Chance (1984)
 Two Tickets to India (1985), animated, based on a story of the same name
 The Pass (1988), animated, based on Village
 The Witches Cave (1989), based on the novella of the same name
 Abduction of the Wizard (1989), based on a story of the same name

External links

Official website
Full bibliography (in Russian)

Alisa and the Guest from the Future Fan Site (in Russian)
Kir Bulychev : Tale-Teller and Scientist
:Obituary

1934 births
2003 deaths
Writers from Moscow
Russian science fiction writers
Soviet science fiction writers
Russian orientalists
Russian speculative fiction critics
Russian speculative fiction translators
Soviet historians
Russian children's writers
Soviet children's writers
Soviet male writers
20th-century Russian male writers
20th-century Russian historians
Recipients of the USSR State Prize
Translators to Russian
20th-century Russian translators
Recipients of the Order "For Merit to the Fatherland", 4th class
20th-century pseudonymous writers